A byssus is a bundle of filaments secreted by many species of bivalve mollusc that function to attach the mollusc to a solid surface. Species from several families of clams have a byssus, including pen shells (Pinnidae), true mussels (Mytilidae), and Dreissenidae.

Filaments
Byssus filaments are created by certain kinds of marine and freshwater bivalve mollusks, which use the byssus to attach themselves to rocks, substrates, or seabeds. In edible mussels, the inedible byssus is commonly known as the "beard", and is removed before cooking.

Many species of mussels secrete byssus threads to anchor themselves to surfaces, with families including the Arcidae, Mytilidae, Anomiidae, Pinnidae, Pectinidae, Dreissenidae, and Unionidae.

Mechanics
The byssus, or byssal complex, is composed of multiple extracellular collagenous threads that are placed radially by the mussel from a central stem.  Each thread is composed of three regions: a corrugated proximal region close to the mussel body, a longer, smooth distal region connecting the proximal region to the ending plaque, and the adhesive plaque itself, which anchors the mussel to the surface.  The proximal region consists of a corrugated sheath enveloping loosely-arranged coiled fibers; these coils can unravel to extend the fiber under an applied force.  The distal region is more ordered, consisting of aligned collagenous fiber bundles that give the fiber stiffness.  The plaque consists of collagen-like fibers over a spongy matrix, in which the adhesive protein is deposited and hardens.

The purpose of the byssus is to keep the mussel attached to the desired surface, and to this end byssal threads must be able to withstand strong cyclic motion due to tidal action near the shorelines mussels inhabit.  Mechanical testing of live mussels has shown that byssal threads can extend 39% before yield and 64% before breaking, at a nominal strain rate of 10 mm/min.  Tensile testing shows that threads exhibit three distinct phases: initial stiffness from both the distal and proximal regions, softening due to yield in the distal region, and finally stiffening directly preceding tensile failure.  The ability of the distal region to yield before breaking gives the mussels their characteristic hardiness even under strong tidal forces.  Many variables that influence the performance of byssal threads have been studied, including species variations, seasonal variations, temperature effects, and ageing effects.  Temperature effects in particular have revealed a glass transition temperature of 6°C.

The number of threads used by a mussel to attach is typically between 20-60; this can vary by the species, season, or age of the mussel.  Under cyclic tidal conditions, the radial spread of fiber placement allows the mussel to dynamically align most of its fibers in the direction of applied force.  This lowers the stress on any one thread, reducing the chances of failure and detachment.  Mussels are also capable of ejecting the entire byssal complex, including the central stem, without damaging themselves.  The complex can simply be regenerated and with fibers placement resuming within 24 hours.

When a mussel's foot encounters a crevice, it creates a vacuum chamber by forcing out the air and arching up, similar to a plumber's plunger unclogging a drain. The byssus, which is made of keratin, quinone-tanned proteins (polyphenolic proteins), and other proteins, is spewed into this chamber in liquid form similar to injection moulding in polymer processing, and bubbles into a sticky foam. By curling its foot into a tube and pumping the foam, the mussel produces sticky threads about the size of a human hair. The mussel then varnishes the threads with another protein, resulting in an adhesive.  The attachment dynamics of the plaque are studied both to imitate the strong adhesive and to create coatings to which the plaque cannot adhere.  Foul release strategies such as fluoropolymer paints and lubricant-infused coatings are an active research area important to preventing the fouling of marine structures by invasive mussel species such as the zebra and quagga mussel.

Biomimetics
Byssus is a remarkable adhesive, one that is neither degraded nor deformed by water as many synthetic adhesives are.  The remarkable properties of this adhesive, specifically the mussel foot proteins (Mfps), has spurred many attempts to imitate the excellent adhesive capacity that mussels show, either by producing Mfps via other organisms or by creating synthetic polymers with similar properties. For instance, genetic engineers have inserted mussel DNA into yeast cells to translate the genes into the appropriate proteins.  Synthetic approaches generally utilize catechol as a cross-linking agent to produce wear-resistant polymer networks.  Imitation of Mfp-3 to induce coacervation is another key property, as this protects the material from partial dissolution in saltwater.

Applications of biomimetic byssus adhesive include biomedical adhesives, therapeutic applications, and anti-fouling coatings.

Historical uses
Byssus often refers to the long, fine, silky threads secreted by the large Mediterranean pen shell, Pinna nobilis.

Byssus cloth is a rare fabric, also known as sea silk, that is made using the byssus of pen shells as the fiber source.

References

External links 

 

Bivalve anatomy
Mollusc products